Luis Theo Fernandez (born 28 September 2001) is an English professional  footballer who plays as a defender for National League South club Hampton & Richmond Borough.

Career

Stevenage
Fernandez joined Stevenage at the age of 13 and progressed through the club's youth system. Following Ben Wilmot's inclusion in the Stevenage first-team; Fernandez, who was still playing regularly for the club's under-16 team at the time, was called up to play at centre-back in the FA Youth Cup against Middlesbrough's under-18 team. He played 90 minutes of the match, which Stevenage lost 2–1. Stevenage head of academy coach Stephen Payne stated he felt Fernandez's late inclusion and ability to deal with the "pressure environment" put Fernandez in good stead for his professional career.

Whilst a second-year scholar, aged 17, Fernandez made his first-team debut in Stevenage's 2–1 home defeat to Southend United in the EFL Cup on 13 August 2019, playing the whole match. After the match, he was singled out for praise by manager Dino Maamria, who described Fernandez's debut as being "a Man of the Match performance". Fernandez signed his first professional contract on 28 August 2019. He made eight first-team appearances during the 2019–20 season.

Loan spells
Having made one first-team appearance for Stevenage during the opening month of the 2020–21 season, Fernandez joined National League South club Oxford City on a three-month loan agreement on 9 October 2020. He made his debut as a 60th-minute substitute in Oxford City's 1–1 away draw with Chelmsford City on 10 October 2020. He played regularly during his time on loan at Oxford City, making 11 appearances in all competitions. Fernandez was recalled by Stevenage on 24 December 2020 following a number of injuries and suspensions within the first-team squad. He rejoined Oxford City on 21 January 2021, on a loan contract for the remainder of the 2020–21 season. He made three further appearances before the National League South season was curtailed due to restrictions associated with the COVID-19 pandemic on 24 February 2021. Fernandez remained at Oxford City until the conclusion of their FA Trophy campaign, losing at the quarter-final stage to Notts County on 27 February 2021. 

He joined National League club King's Lynn Town on a season-long loan agreement on 12 July 2021.

Hampton & Richmond Borough
On 25 May 2022, Fernandez agreed to join National League South side, Hampton & Richmond Borough ahead of the 2022–23 campaign.

Career statistics

References

External links

2001 births
Living people
English footballers
Association football defenders
Stevenage F.C. players
Oxford City F.C. players
King's Lynn Town F.C. players
Hampton & Richmond Borough F.C. players
English Football League players